The Pine Apple Historic District is a historic district in the community of Pine Apple, Alabama.  It was placed on the National Register of Historic Places on February 26, 1999.  The boundaries are roughly Wilcox County roads 59, 7 and 61, Broad Street, Banana Street, AL 10, and Adams Drive.  It contains , 54 buildings, and 1 structures ranging from the Craftsman to Colonial Revival styles.

See also
Historical Marker Database

References

National Register of Historic Places in Wilcox County, Alabama
Historic districts in Wilcox County, Alabama
Colonial Revival architecture in Alabama
American Craftsman architecture in Alabama
Historic districts on the National Register of Historic Places in Alabama